Vegetia ducalis, the ducal princeling, is a species of moth in the family Saturniidae. It was described by Karl Jordan in 1922. It is found in South Africa.

The larvae feed on Eriocephalus umbellatus and Eriosema species.

References

Endemic moths of South Africa
Moths described in 1922
Ducalis
Moths of Africa
Taxa named by Karl Jordan